Hilary Reilly is an Irish diplomat who is currently serving as the Ambassador of Ireland to Malaysia.

Diplomatic career 
Reilly's recommendation to succeed Eamon Hickey as Ambassador of Ireland to Malaysia was approved by the Government of Ireland on the 26 June 2019. She subsequently presented her diplomatic accreditation to the Yang di-Pertuan Agong (Head of state and King of Malaysia) on 2 October 2019.

Prior to her appointment as an ambassador, Reilly served as deputy head of mission at the Embassy of Ireland in Ottawa, Canada. In 2015, she was next posted to the Irish Embassy in Washington, D.C. as the political counsellor for EU & International Affairs, coincidentally serving under former Irish Ambassador to Malaysia and current Ambassador of Ireland to the United States, Daniel Mulhall.

External links

References 

Living people
Year of birth missing (living people)
20th-century Irish people
21st-century Irish people
Ambassadors of Ireland to Malaysia
21st-century diplomats
Irish diplomats
Irish women ambassadors